Boygenius (stylized in all lowercase) is an American indie rock supergroup formed in 2018 by Julien Baker, Phoebe Bridgers, and Lucy Dacus. Their self-titled debut EP was written and recorded at Sound City Studios in Los Angeles. On January 18, 2023, the band announced their debut studio album, The Record, with a release date of March 31.

History

2018: Formation, EP, and tour
Bridgers has called the formation of the group "kind of an accident," wherein each of the members were simply fans of each other's work and then became friends. Both Dacus and Bridgers had opened for Baker on separate tours in 2016, and they all ran in similar circles as young up-and-coming performers navigating the indie scene.

The three became close, and they shared frustration at constantly being compared to each other as "women in rock" despite their considerably different musical styles. Dacus has commented that the idea of women in music "should not be remarkable whatsoever," with Bridgers adding, "it's not a genre." Each has spoken on the tendency of the music industry to pit women against each other, and the group was formed in part to reject this idea. "I hope people see the three of us and know there isn't competition," Dacus has said. "You don't have to compete with your contemporaries. You can make something good with people you admire."

Baker had joked to Dacus years before about a "pipe dream" that they could one day all form a band. The three decided to book a co-headlining tour in early 2018, and they originally planned to record a single or a cover so that they could perform something together on stage. Upon meeting up that summer, however, they found themselves overwhelmed with ideas, and they ended up forming the band, writing, recording, and self-producing the Boygenius EP in four days, with the process involving almost exclusively women.

Each brought one full song and one incomplete idea with them to the group. They sought to create an environment free of the competitiveness and "bravado" they had often encountered in previous experiences, and they have remarked that the absence of adult men in the process proved significant, allowing them to relate to each other openly without constantly having to explain themselves. The record was met with universal acclaim from critics and audiences alike; it was named the 12th best album of 2018 by NPR Music, despite being only an EP. Their subsequent tour that November saw them performing all across the U.S., as well as on Late Night with Seth Meyers and the Tiny Desk.

2019–2022: Continuing collaborations

The group was slated to perform in summer 2019 at Woodstock 50, before its cancellation due to a series of production issues. In 2020, they were featured on Hayley Williams' "Roses/Lotus/Violet/Iris" from her EP Petals for Armor II, and also reunited on backing vocals for numerous songs from each other's solo projects: "Graceland Too" and "I Know the End" from Bridgers' Grammy-nominated Punisher, Baker's Little Oblivions single "Favor," and Dacus's "Please Stay" and "Going Going Gone" on Home Video. With the releases scattered throughout the year, all of these were actually recorded on the same day, a process Dacus said "had the same atmosphere as when we recorded the boygenius EP[...] a natural result of being together, easy as can be."

In July 2020, the trio released a handful of demos from their Boygenius recording sessions on Bandcamp to raise money for charitable organizations in their respective hometowns, raising over $23,000 for the Downtown Women's Center of Los Angeles, OUTMemphis, and Mutual Aid Distribution Richmond.

After reuniting on stage for occasional surprise appearances at one another's solo tours throughout fall 2021, the group performed their first full show together since 2018 as the headliner of Bread and Roses Presents' annual benefit concert in San Francisco on November 19.

2023-present: The Record 
In January 2023, the band announced via social media the upcoming release of a full-length LP entitled The Record with a release date of March 2023. The album artwork and three singles from the album, "$20", "Emily I'm Sorry" and "True Blue" were released alongside the album's initial announcement.

On January 31, 2023, AEG (Anschutz Entertainment Group) Presents announced that the band would be one of three headline acts at the inaugural Re:SET Concert Series.

Name 
The group has been vocal about the origins of their name, which began as a joke and a way to encourage each other in the studio. All three had shared negative experiences with overconfident male collaborators—as Baker put it, "the archetype of the tortured genius, [a] specifically male artist who has been told since birth that their every thought is not only worthwhile but brilliant." Dacus described the "boy genius" trope as "boys and men we know who've been told that they are geniuses since they could hear, basically," and has detailed how they attempted to channel that energy while making the EP. "If one person was having a thought—'I don't know if this is good, it's probably terrible'—it was like, 'No! Be the boy genius! Your every thought is worthwhile, just spit it out.

The group occasionally writes their name as "xboygeniusx," such as on social media and their website. This is a tongue-in-cheek reference to the X symbol of the straight edge punk subculture, which Baker was somewhat involved in as a teen. She noted that they had all joked about Boygenius being a hardcore band, and when creating their social media they thought it would be funny to stylize themselves as extremely punk when it wasn't characteristic of any of their music at the time.

Discography

Studio albums

Extended plays

Singles

Notes

References

American indie rock groups
Rock music supergroups
Year of establishment missing
Musical groups established in 2018
2018 establishments in the United States